The Weakness is the 37th book in the Animorphs series, written by K.A. Applegate. It is known to have been ghostwritten by Elise Smith. It is narrated by Rachel.

Plot summary
During a failed attempt to assassinate Visser Three using cheetah morphs, the Animorphs learn that the Council of Thirteen has sent an inspector to check up on the progress of the invasion of Earth. Seeing an opportunity to discredit Visser Three politically, Rachel devises a plan to terrorize local businesses run by known Controllers. With Jake out of town, Rachel is temporarily elected to lead the Animorphs, much to Marco's disdain.

The Animorphs spend the day putting Rachel's plan into action. Their first raid occurs at a news station, where a tour is being given to a group of people. An elderly man is shocked by the sight of wild animals destroying the news room and falls down. During a break in the operation, Rachel and Cassie see a news report covering the first raid and learn that the man who fell down has died of a heart attack.

Rachel pushes the Animorphs for one last raid at the Community Center, and opts to go in with everyone morphed as polar bears. The others are hesitant since they have lost the element of surprise and the Community Center is a Yeerk stronghold, but Rachel remains insistent. The raid goes badly after Visser Three and the inspector, a Garatron-Controller, join the fight. Having all morphed the same animal and therefore having no versatility, the Animorphs are forced to withdraw, but Cassie is captured before she can get out.

The remaining Animorphs return to Cassie's barn. Rachel, devastated by her leadership failure, attempts to pass the responsibility to Marco, who berates her for her show-off attitude seen throughout the day. Marco declines, saying that any attempt to rescue Cassie is Rachel's responsibility. With less than an hour to save Cassie, Rachel comes up with a plan to get them into the Yeerk pool.

Rachel, Marco, and a human-morphed Tobias and Ax assemble at Morgan Airport, where they jump the fence and hijack a private jet belonging to Phillip Morris USA. After putting the plane on a collision course with a vacant building that is known to harbor a large entrance for Bug fighters to access the Yeerk pool complex, the Animorphs bail out of the plane in their various bird-of-prey morphs and fly into the Yeerk pool. Rachel is the first to arrive, where she and Cassie are forced to engage several Hork-Bajir-Controllers. The fighting is quickly halted by Visser Three, however, when he challenges the Garatron-inspector to defeat the "Andalite bandits" for himself. The inspector reluctantly accepts and engages Rachel and Cassie. They struggle to hold their ground against the incredibly fast Garatron-Controller until Tobias and Ax arrive, carrying Marco in king cobra morph. Marco manages to fatally bite the inspector and the Animorphs make their escape. Visser Three makes no effort to stop them and mocks the inspector as he slowly dies from the venom.

Rachel visits the family of the man who died during the raid on the news station. After offering her condolences, she quickly leaves and finds Jake waiting for her in the driveway. Rachel tells Jake that she "screwed up", but Jake retorts that she didn't get anyone killed and that is all that matters. Rachel tells Jake to never go away again.

New morphs

Animorphs books
1999 novels